Vol. II is the fourth full-length studio album by the rock band Hurt, and was released on September 25, 2007.

Sound and musical style
This album shares many of the sorrowful and painful themes as Vol. I. However, many songs on this album have slower tempos and more acoustic instrumentation, while still maintaining a hard rock sound. Another change from Vol. I is the inclusion of different instruments, such as the banjo and dobro, and a lineup of female backup singers.

Background
Before having Eric Greedy mix the album, the band had sent it to a mixing engineer who did not mix the album to the band's satisfaction.  J. Loren said of the situation, "...he was a very notable person that we paid a large sum of money to, and he destroyed the record. It sounded so horrible, I actually had a nervous breakdown when I heard the record, and they threw me in a van before the cops came. So, I thought that my life was over, I just literally could not handle the devastation of it."

Many of the songs on this album are rerecorded from previous works. The songs "Summers Lost," "Abuse of SID," and "Better" are originally from Hurt's self-titled album.  "Alone With the Sea," "Loded," and "Et Al" are originally from The Consumation.

"Loded," the second single from this album, was chosen by a poll taken on the band's forum.

The band also released alternate mixes to the songs "Talking to God" and "On the Radio" through their MySpace.

Track listing

Personnel
Personnel information from album liner notes.

J. Loren Wince - vocals, guitar, violin, banjo, string arrangement
Paul Spatola - guitar, dobro, piano
Josh Ansley - bass
Evan Johns - drums

Additional personnel
Eric Greedy - producer, engineering, mixing
Leon Zervos - mastering
Lenny Castro - percussion
Valerie Carter - additional vocal support
Machan Taylor - additional vocal support
Elaine Caswell - additional vocal support
Eyvonne Williams-Hines - additional vocal support
Lynn Fiddmont - additional vocal support
Novi Novog - string arrangement
Dave Klotz - string arrangement, programming
Larry Tuttle - string arrangement
Brian Winshell - programming
Jason Benham - additional engineering
Cecil Gregory - additional engineering
Tom Gloady - additional engineering
Ted Taylor - art director, photography

Reception 

The album was praised by both fans and critics. It did exceptionally well in many professional reviews.  It has sold nearly 50,000 copies since its release.

On May 12, 2009, Hurt received an award for the song "Ten Ton Brick" during SESAC’s 13th annual New York Music Awards.

Charts

Singles

References 

Hurt (band) albums
2007 albums
Sequel albums